Chan Hung Ping (Chinese: 陳鴻平; born 6 December 1942 in Taiwan) is a Taiwanese football manager who is the current technical director for Hong Kong Premier League club Lee Man.

Career
Despite spending most of his life in Hong Kong, Chan decided to represent Taiwan internationally due to the better treatment, payment, and popularity in Southeast Asia.

References

Taiwanese footballers
Living people
Association football midfielders
1968 AFC Asian Cup players
Taiwanese football managers
1942 births